The Delhi Railway  was a railway company that operated in British India. It later merged with Scinde Railway, Punjab Railway and Indus Steam Flotilla to form the Scinde, Punjab & Delhi Railway.

References 

Transport in Delhi
Defunct railway companies of India